Alexander "Alex" Fasser (born May 20, 1975, died September 02, 2021) was an Austrian ski mountaineer and mountain biker.

Fasser started ski mountaineering in 1995 and competed first in the 2001 Biberwierer Tourenlauf. He has been member of the ASKIMO national team since 2008 and lived in Lermoos.

Selected results

Ski mountaineering 
 2005:
 1st: Sellrain Valley marathon
 2006:
 1st, Tyrolian Championship
 2007:
 1st, Hochgrat ski rallye
 2nd, Jennerstier
 3rd, Tre Cime Alpin Maratona
 5th, Austrian Championship
 2009:
 4th, European Championship relay race (together with Johann Wieland, Martin Bader and Wolfgang Klocker)
 2010:
 5th, World Championship relay race (together with Jakob Herrmann, Markus Stock and Wolfgang Klocker)
 2011:
 5th, World Championship relay, together with Markus Stock, Daniel Rohringer and Jakob Herrmann
 7th, World Championship team race (together with Jakob Herrmann)
 2012:
 7th, European Championship vertical race
 7th, European Championship relay, together with Martin Weißkopf, Martin Islitzer and Markus Stock
 2nd, Hochgrat ski rallye

Patrouille des Glaciers 

 2010: 8th ("ISMF men" class ranking), together with Wolfgang Klocker and Markus Stock

Mountain biking 
 2006:
 1st, Tyrolian Championship

External links 
 Alexander Fasser at skimountaineering.org
 Alexander Fasser , ASKIMO

References 

1975 births
Living people
Austrian male ski mountaineers